Yelena Jemayeva (also spelled Elena, born 30 March 1971) is a Russian-born Azerbaijani sabre fencer. She holds a twice World champion (1999, 2000) and European champion (1999).

She competed in the individual sabre event at the 2004 Summer Olympics but was upset in the quarterfinals by eventual gold medalist Mariel Zagunis of USA. 

Jemayeva is married and lives in Moscow. She is the wife of the Olympic and world team champion fencer Ilgar Mammadov, Yelena and Ilgar have two daughters: Milena and Ayla.

References

External links
 
 
 

1971 births
Living people
Sportspeople from Moscow
Russian emigrants to Azerbaijan
Azerbaijani female sabre fencers
Russian female sabre fencers
Olympic fencers of Azerbaijan
Fencers at the 2004 Summer Olympics